Peter Kunkel (born 10 February 1956) is a German football manager and former player who played as a forward

References

External links
 
 

1956 births
Living people
German footballers
Association football forwards
SG Wattenscheid 09 players
2. Bundesliga players
3. Liga managers
German football managers
Rot-Weiß Oberhausen managers
Footballers from Essen
20th-century German people